Die Farm was the first season of the German local show of The Farm. Showered on RTL. The show was started on January 31, 2010 and finished on April 4, 2010. The show was host by Inka Bause. Die Farm was filmed in Norway. The winner Markus received €50,000 from the prize.

Contestants

Nominations

External links
RTL - Die Farm - Inka Bause - Ivana - Rene - Hofi - Cornelia  - RTL.de

Television series by Endemol
The Farm (franchise)
2010 German television series debuts
2010 German television series endings
German-language television shows
RTL (German TV channel) original programming
German reality television series